The 2011–12 Kategoria Superiore was the 73rd official season, or 76th season of top-tier football in Albania (including three unofficial championships of WW2) and the fourteenth season under the name Kategoria superiore. The season began on 10 September 2011 and ended on 12 May 2012. The defending champions were Skënderbeu, who won their second Albanian league championship last season and third in their history.

The size of the league was expanded from twelve to fourteen teams this season.

Teams 
Besa and Elbasani finished the 2010–11 season in 11th and 12th place and were relegated to the Kategoria e Parë. Taking their places were the champions of the 2010–11 Kategoria e Parë competition, Pogradeci, and the runners-up, Tomori.

In addition, because the league expanded to 14 clubs this season, the third- and fourth-placed clubs of last season's Kategoria e Parë were also promoted to this competition automatically. These clubs were Kamza and Apolonia.

Finally, two more spots in this competition were available via a promotion-relegation playoff between the 9th and 10th-place finishers of last season's Kategoria Superiore, Shkumbini Peqin and Dinamo Tirana, and the 5th and 6th-place finishers of last season's Kategoria e Parë, Besëlidhja Lezhë and Adriatiku Mamurras. Shkumbini defeated Adriatiku 1–0 after extra time and Dinamo Tirana defeated Besëlidhja 4–1, so both Superiore teams retained their spots in the league for this season.

Stadia and last season

Personnel and sponsoring

Managerial changes

League table

Results

Positions by round

Relegation playoffs
The 10th-, 11th- and 12th-placed Superliga teams competed against the third-, fourth- and fifth-placed First Division sides in single match relegation playoffs.

Top scorers

Source:

References

External links
 Official website 

2011-12
Alb
1